Erik Waldemar "Burret" Larsson (18 January 1905 – 8 March 1970) was a Swedish ice hockey, football and bandy player, best known for representing Hammarby IF in all three sports. He won the silver medal with Sweden's ice hockey team in the 1928 Winter Olympics.

Athletic career

Ice hockey
In 1924, at age 17, Larsson made his debut for Hammarby IF in the Klass I, Sweden's top division. He would go on to form a feared forward line with Helge Johansson and Sigfrid Öberg in the upcoming years. In 1928, Larsson competed in the Winter Olympics in St. Moritz with Sweden, and won the silver medal. In total, Larsson played 11 international games for his country. He is a recipient of the honorary award Stora Grabbars Märke, handed out by the Swedish Ice Hockey Association. He won two Swedish championships – in 1932 and 1933 – with Hammarby IF, the club's first domestic titles. After 13 seasons with the club, Larsson retired from ice hockey in 1936. He returned to Hammarby IF a few years later, working as the head coach for two seasons between 1938 and 1940.

Football

In 1924–25, Larsson made his debut for Hammarby IF in Allsvenskan, the inaugural season of Sweden's new first-tier football league. He played 11 games as a midfielder, scoring two goals, but was unable to save the club from a relegation. He continued to play football with the club in Division 2, the second tier, until 1933 and made 79 league appearances in total.

Bandy
Larsson also played bandy with Hammarby IF. In the 1920s, Hammarby pushed for a Swedish Championship title, which by then was decided by a cup, but got knocked out in the later stages of the play-offs. In 1931, Larsson competed in the inaugural season of Allsvenskan, a national league.

References

External links
 

1905 births
1970 deaths
Allsvenskan players
Hammarby Fotboll players
Hammarby Hockey (1921–2008) players
Hammarby IF Bandy players
Ice hockey players at the 1928 Winter Olympics
Medalists at the 1928 Winter Olympics
Olympic ice hockey players of Sweden
Olympic medalists in ice hockey
Olympic silver medalists for Sweden
Ice hockey people from Stockholm
Swedish bandy players
Swedish ice hockey players
Swedish footballers
Association football midfielders